Maeve Quinlan (born November 16, 1964) is an American actress. She is best known for starring as Megan Conley for 11 years in The Bold and the Beautiful and for the series South of Nowhere.

Career

Quinlan entered the professional tennis circuit at age 16. She competed in the French Open, Wimbledon and U.S. Open. Quinlan earned her full scholarship to both USC and Northwestern University, where she studied theater.  After an injury, she quit tennis and pursued an acting career, starting with parts in commercials for Nike and Gatorade.

Prior to South of Nowhere, she was a regular on the soap opera The Bold and the Beautiful, where from 1995 to 2005 she played Megan Conley. She returned for a three-week guest-starring role on the show in March 2006, while on hiatus from South of Nowhere. One of her more notable roles was that of Rhonda in the 2002 movie Ken Park, a controversial film in which she received oral sex from the boyfriend of her character's daughter. She also starred in the unsuccessful comedy Totally Blonde in 2001, and in 2007, the popular web series Girltrash!

She starred in the 2009 movie Not Easily Broken with Morris Chestnut and Taraji P. Henson. She co-created, co-produced, and starred in 3 Way, a web series about roommates, which featured lesbian characters, with Jill Bennett, Maile Flanagan, and Cathy Shim.

Personal life

Quinlan is a first-generation American, the daughter of Irish immigrants, and holds dual US/Irish citizenship. She was married to actor Tom Sizemore until their divorce.

Filmography

Film

Television

Web

References

External links
 
 

1964 births
Living people
Actresses from Chicago
American people of Irish descent
American female tennis players
Tennis people from Illinois
USC Trojans women's tennis players
New Trier High School alumni